Pomaderris vacciniifolia, commonly known as round-leaf pomaderris, is a species of flowering plant in the family Rhamnaceae and is endemic to Victoria in Australia. It is a shrub with softly-hairy branchlets, elliptic leaves and panicles of creamy-white flowers.

Description
The upper surface of the leaves is glabrous and the lower surface is densely covered with soft, whitish, star-shaped hairs. The flowers are creamy-white and covered with soft, greyish, star-shaped hairs. Flowering occurs in October.

Taxonomy
Pomaderris vacciniifolia was first formally described in 1858 by Siegfried Reissek in the journal Linnaea: Ein Journal für die Botanik in ihrem ganzen Umfange from specimens collected by Ferdinand von Mueller near Watts River.

Distribution and habitat
Round-leaf pomaderris grows in moist forest and scrub, mostly in the upper and midle catchments of the Yarra River between Healesville, Eltham and Flowerdale.

Conservation status
Pomaderris vacciniifolia is classified as "critically endangered" under the Australian Government Environment Protection and Biodiversity Conservation Act 1999 and as "endangered" under the Victorian Government Flora and Fauna Guarantee Act 1988. The main threats to the species include weed invasion, grazing by herbivores and road maintenance.

In 2008, the plant's conservation status was highlighted when it was revealed that several plants had branches removed during construction of the North–South Pipeline.

Factors in the decline of the species include browsing by feral deer, land clearing, and the 2009 Black Saturday bushfires.

References

vacciniifolia
Flora of Victoria (Australia)
Plants described in 1858